Brian Dawson may refer to:

 Brian Dawson (general) (born 1954), Australian Army officer and museum administrator
 Brian Dawson (football coach) (born 1958), Australian rules football coach and academic
 Brian Dawson (folk singer) (1939–2013), British folk song collector, musician and singer
 Brian Dawson (darts player) (born 1968), English darts player